Vallecitos is a mountain subrange/area in Argentina. It is located at Antofagasta de la Sierra, Catamarca Province, at the Puna de Atacama.

First ascent 
The first recorded ascent of Cerro Vallecitos was by Henri Barret (France) April 14, 1999.

Elevation 
Other data from available digital elevation models: SRTM yields 6097 metres, ASTER 6079 metres, ASTER filled 6097 metres, ALOS 6079 metres, TanDEM-X 6138 metres, The height of the nearest key col is 4930 meters, leading to a topographic prominence of 1190 meters. Vallecitos is considered a Mountain Subrange according to the Dominance System  and its dominance is 19.44%. Its parent peak is Sierra Nevada de Lagunas Bravas and the Topographic isolation is 39.4 kilometers.

References

External links 
 Elevation information about Vallecitos
 Weather Forecast at Vallecitos

Six-thousanders of the Andes
Volcanoes of Catamarca Province
Mountains of Argentina